Larry J. Parrish (born November 14, 1941) is an American politician from Georgia. Parrish is a Republican member of the Georgia House of Representatives from the 158th District, serving since 1985.

Parrish is a businessman and a pharmacist. Parrish is the owner of Parrish Properties.

Personal life 
Parrish's first wife was Linda, they had 2 children together. His second wife was Charlotte,  she has since died. He has since remarried. Parrish and his family live in Swainsboro, Georgia.

References

External links 
 Butch Parrish at ballotpedia.org

1941 births
21st-century American politicians
Living people
Republican Party members of the Georgia House of Representatives
People from Swainsboro, Georgia